Server.com was a software as a service (SaaS) provider that offered a suite of services from 1996 until 2007. It was the first SaaS site to offer a variety of services and the first to use the term WebApp to describe its services.
It was selected as an Incredibly Useful Site by Yahoo! Internet Life magazine.
net magazine listed Server.com among the 100 most influential websites of all time.

Server.com launched in 1996 offering the first online personal information manager.

In 1997, they rolled out the first threaded message board service;
the first web based mailing list manager;
one of the first online calendar services; and one of the first online form builders.

In 2000, Server.com partnered with NBCi and became server.snap.com until 2001.

In 2001, Server.com was serving 100 million monthly pageviews. Media Life declared it one of the 20 biggest ad domains on the Web.

In 2002, Server.com developed one of the first web-based RSS aggregators.

In 2007, all services were moved to YourWebApps.com.

The domain name Server.com was sold in 2009 for $770,000.

References

External Links 
YourWebApps.com - Hosts one last forum as of July, 2022.
NE Disc App - A working recreation of the DiscussionApp service.
sean.brunnock.com - Founder's personal account of Server.com.

Web applications
Internet forum hosting
Electronic mailing lists
Calendaring software
News aggregators
Personal information managers
Internet_properties_established_in_1996
Internet properties disestablished in 2007
Defunct websites